The 2013 PTT Thailand Open was a men's tennis tournament played on indoor hard courts. It was the 11th and last edition of the Thailand Open, and part of the ATP World Tour 250 Series of the 2013 ATP World Tour. It took place at the Impact Arena in Bangkok, Thailand, from 21 September through 29 September 2013.  Third-seeded Milos Raonic won the singles title.

Finals

Singles

  Milos Raonic defeated  Tomáš Berdych, 7–6(7–4), 6–3

Doubles

  Jamie Murray /  John Peers defeated  Tomasz Bednarek /  Johan Brunström, 6–3, 3–6, [10–6]

Singles main-draw entrants

Seeds

Rankings are as of September 16, 2013

Other entrants
The following players received wildcards into the singles main draw:
  Laslo Djere
  Jeong Suk-young 
  Wishaya Trongcharoenchaikul

The following players received entry from the qualifying draw:
  Marco Chiudinelli 
  Alejandro Falla 
  Santiago Giraldo 
  Go Soeda

Withdrawals
Before the tournament
  Ivan Dodig
  Andy Murray (back surgery)
  Tommy Robredo

Retirements
  Ivo Karlović (back injury)

Doubles main-draw entrants

Seeds

 Rankings are as of September 16, 2013

Other entrants
The following pairs received wildcards into the doubles main draw:
  Laslo Djere /  Wishaya Trongcharoenchaikul
  Lu Yen-hsun /  Danai Udomchoke

External links

Official website

 
 ATP World Tour
Tennis, ATP World Tour, PTT Thailand Open
Tennis, ATP World Tour, PTT Thailand Open

Tennis, ATP World Tour, PTT Thailand Open